Hillman Estate Car may refer to: 
 A variant of the Hillman Minx
 A variant of the Rootes Arrow

Estate Car